The Kaohsiung Marriott Hotel is a  skyscraper hotel completed in 2020 in Gushan District, Kaohsiung, Taiwan. The building is phase one of the E SKY LAND complex. Operated by Marriott Hotels & Resorts, the hotel has started trial operations on December 25, 2020 and will start operating fully on April 3, 2021.

Facilities
The hotel has a total of 606 rooms plus 94 premium suites, 8 themed restaurants, one café and a bar.

Restaurants & Bars 
 M-Chef Steak & Teppanyaki: Restaurant serving premium prime cut steak and red wine.
 Huang Hao Chinese Restaurant: Chinese restaurant featuring traditional  Cantonese cuisine.
 M9 Buffet Restaurant: Buffet offering a wide variety of dishes from around the globe.
 Kyo Raku Japanese Cuisine & Hot Pot: Japanese restaurant offering Japanese hot pot.
 Kyo Kyo Japanese Buffet
 The Lounge: Lounge serving A la carte menu of signature specialties.
 King Chui Hong Kong Cafe: Hong Kong-style café featuring dim sum, beef chow fun and Hong Kong-style milk tea.
 R3 Sky Bar: Sky bar offering cocktails with a panoramic view of Kaohsiung's night skyline.
 Majesty Restaurant: French restaurant featuring curated by internationally acclaimed Michelin three-starred chef-consultant, Thomas Bühner.
 T-Fusion: Coffee house serving hot beverages and pastries.

See also
 List of tallest buildings in Taiwan
 List of tallest buildings in Kaohsiung
 Marriott Hotels & Resorts
 Kaohsiung Grand Hotel
 Han-Hsien International Hotel
 Grand Hi-Lai Hotel

References

External links
Kaohsiung Marriott Hotel Official Website 

2020 establishments in Taiwan
Buildings and structures in Kaohsiung
Skyscraper hotels in Kaohsiung
Hotel buildings completed in 2020